The Prek Kdam Bridge is a 981-meter bridge that crosses the Tonle Sap River in the Kandal Province at Ponhea Lueu.

References

Road bridges in Phnom Penh
Transport in Phnom Penh